Calliostoma schroederi, common name Schroeder's top shell, is a species of sea snail, a marine gastropod mollusk in the family Calliostomatidae.

Description
The height of the shell attains 31.5 mm.

Distribution
This species occurs in the Caribbean Sea and in the Gulf of Mexico at depths between 265 m and 439 m.

References

 Clench, W. J. and C. G. Aguayo. 1938. Notes and descriptions of new species of Calliostoma, Gaza and Columbarium (Mollusca); obtained by the Harvard-Habana Expedition off the coast of Cuba. Memorias de la Sociedad Cubana de Historia Natural "Felipe Poey" 12: 375–384, pl. 28.
 Rosenberg, G., F. Moretzsohn, and E. F. García. 2009. Gastropoda (Mollusca) of the Gulf of Mexico, Pp. 579–699 in Felder, D.L. and D.K. Camp (eds.), Gulf of Mexico–Origins, Waters, and Biota. Biodiversity. Texas A&M Press, College Station, Texas.

External links
 

schroederi
Gastropods described in 1938